If Memory Serves may refer to:

"If Memory Serves", season 2 episode 8 of Star Trek: Discovery
"If Memory Serves (Dexter's Laboratory)", season 3 episode 5a of Dexter's Laboratory